Dene Academy (formerly Dene Community School) is a coeducational secondary school located in Peterlee, County Durham, England.

Established in 1962, in November 2012 the school relocated to a new building on the same site. Previously a community school administered by Durham County Council, in September 2019 Dene Community School converted to academy status and was renamed Dene Academy. The school is now sponsored by the Advance Learning Partnership.

Dene Academy offers GCSEs and BTECs as programmes of study for pupils. Most graduating students go on to attend East Durham College.

References

External links
Dene Academy official website

Secondary schools in County Durham
Academies in County Durham
Educational institutions established in 1962
1962 establishments in England
Peterlee